King's Highway 28, commonly referred to as Highway 28, is a provincially maintained highway in the Canadian province of Ontario. The southwest–northeast route extends from Highway 7 east of Peterborough, to Highway 41 in Denbigh. The route passes over undulating hills before entering the Canadian Shield near Burleigh Falls, and gradually turns eastward.

Highway 28 was assigned in 1928, incorporating Highway 12A, one of the original provincial highways. It was extended in the following decade, first to Apsley and then to a new Department of Roads and Northern Development centre in Bancroft. In the early 1980s, Highway 500 was added as an extension, reaching Denbigh. Portions of the highway were decommissioned or transferred in the 1990s, and in 2003 Highway 134 was added, extending the southern terminus to Highway 7.

Route description 

The road that carries Highway 28 continues south as Peterborough County Road 34 (Heritage Line). Proceeding north, Highway 28 crosses the Peterborough Drumlin Field, an area dominated by undulating terrain oriented in a southwest–northeast direction. Despite this, the highway progresses due north without regard for the terrain; numerous cuts and fills have since flattened the route for easier travel. Passing east of Lakefield, the straight path of the route is interrupted by the Otonabee River; it curves northeast and intersects Peterborough County Road 29 (Queen Street) and Road 6 while travelling south of the river. At Young's Point, the southern tip of Stony Lake, the highway crosses the river and serves cottages along the western shore of the lake.

Within Burleigh Falls, Highway 28 encounters the eastern terminus of the former Highway 36. From there it continues northeast through the rugged shield to Highway 118, at which point it has curved fully to the east. The highway passes through Bancroft, where it encounters Highway 62. East of Bancroft, there is relatively little human inhabitation, with the exception of a select group of communities located on or nearby the highway. At the community of Denbigh, Highway 28 ends at a junction with Highway 41.

History 
Highway 28 was assigned in 1928, when the entirety of Highway 12A was renumbered. Highway 12A was one of the original provincial highways assumed in 1919 and 1920. The Port Hope – Peterborough Road was assumed by the Department of Highways on August 11, 1920, extending from Highway 2 (Walton Street) in Port Hope to Highway 7 (George Street North) in downtown Peterborough.
The route received the 12A numbering during the summer of 1925.

During the mid-1930s, Highway 28 was extended as far north as Apsley. This was accomplished by assuming existing Peterborough County roads along the Otonabee River as far as Burleigh Falls, via Lakefield. North of there, the department assumed the Burleigh Falls Road. Highway 28 was extended from Peterborough to Burleigh Falls on April 4, 1934.
The Burleigh Falls Road was assumed to Apsley on August 11, 1937.

During the 1936 fiscal year, preparations were made for the upcoming merger of the Department of Northern Development and Department of Highway, which occurred on April 1, 1937. The town of Bancroft was chosen as the location of the first operations centre for the new Central District of the department. Consequently, it was decided to extend Highway 28 to the town along the remainder of the Burleigh Falls Road.

Plans to connect Ottawa with Bancroft arose in the mid-1950s. When the province designated Highway 132 in January 1956, they also announced plans for a new highway which would travel south from Renfrew to Calabogie, then turn west towards Denbigh and Bancroft. Ultimately this road was never constructed, but new road links were established in the following years regardless.
In early 1956, Highway 500 was established between Kinmount and Hermon following the Monck Road.
In 1963, a new road was constructed between McArthur Mills and Denbigh through the Madawaska Highlands, and opened as an extension of Highway 500 on July 1.
During the early 1980s, Highway 500 was renumbered as an extension of Highway 28. This took place between 1980 and 1982.

During the 1997 and 1998 mass downloading of highways, the southern  of Highway 28 were transferred to the counties of Peterborough and Northumberland, the town of Port Hope and Lakefield and the city of Peterborough. The section from Highway 115 north to Lakefield was decommissioned on April 1, 1997.
On January 1, 1998, the southernmost section, between Highway 2 and Highway 115, was transferred.
During the spring of 2003, the entirety of Highway 134 was redesignated as part of Highway 28, extending the southern terminus to Highway 7 east of Peterborough.

Major intersections

References

Citations

Sources 
 Books

External links 

 
 Highway 28 pictures and information

028